Tettnang may refer to:

Tettnang, a city in Germany
Tettnang, the codename for Red Hat's Fedora Core 2 Linux distribution (final), released on May 18, 2004.